Villa Ojo de Agua is a municipality and village in Santiago del Estero Province in Argentina.

It is located south of Santiago del Estero, and north of Cordoba, being crossed by National Route No. 9.

References

Populated places in Santiago del Estero Province
Municipalities of Argentina